Baljit ("Baljeet") Singh Dhillon (born June 18, 1973) is a field hockey midfielder from India, who made his international debut for the Men's National Team in 1993 during the test series against South Africa. Nicknamed Balli, Singh Dhillon represented his native country at three consecutive Summer Olympics, starting in 1996 in Atlanta, Georgia, where India finished in eighth place.

References
 Bharatiya Hockey
Baljit Singh Dhillon retires

External links
 

1973 births
Living people
Male field hockey forwards
Field hockey players at the 1996 Summer Olympics
Field hockey players at the 2000 Summer Olympics
Field hockey players at the 2004 Summer Olympics
Olympic field hockey players of India
2002 Men's Hockey World Cup players
Place of birth missing (living people)
Indian male field hockey players
Asian Games medalists in field hockey
Field hockey players at the 1994 Asian Games
Field hockey players at the 1998 Asian Games
Asian Games gold medalists for India
Asian Games silver medalists for India
Medalists at the 1994 Asian Games
Medalists at the 1998 Asian Games
Recipients of the Arjuna Award